Colihaut is a coastal village in northern Dominica within Saint Peter Parish midway between the towns of Roseau and Portsmouth. It has a population of 773 people.

Colihaut Beach is primarily gray sand with smooth waters runs along the coastal edge of the town flanked by mountain ranges.

The conservation of Colihaut natural resources is essential for ecological value and economic prosperity.  

Majority of Colihaut inhabitants are earning their living in quarrying operations alongside or fishing activities. Quarries in Colihaut are managed by West Indies Aggregate Ltd (WIA), operated by Jacques Gaddarkhan.

A primary school, sports field, day nursery, post office, credit union, Village Council, health center and four Christian churches provide services to villagers. Residents earn a living mainly through agriculture and fishing. Secondary school graduates work for government and the private sector in Roseau. The young people who do not proceed to secondary school either emigrate, are unemployed or underemployed. A large percentage of the village's income however comes from remittances from family abroad.

In August 2015, Tropical Storm Erika battered Dominica. Heavy rains led to massive flooding, causing many homes on the river bank to leave their foundations. The buildings that remained in place became conduits for the river that breached its banks. Mud, silt and rubble filled the roads to a depth of many feet making travel by car or truck impossible. First responders had to use boats to assess the situation and offer aid.

Due to the storm Colihaut Primary School remained closed due to damage and lack of water well into the school year. Students were forced to commute to another school (Dublanc Primary School) and participate in a shift system where they were schooled for only a half day.

References

External links
 St. Peter's Church in Colihaut
On-Site Dominica: Remnants Of T.S. Erika Along The Road To Recovery

Populated places in Dominica
Saint Peter Parish, Dominica